Marc Camoletti may refer to:

 Marc Camoletti (playwright) (1923–2003), French playwright
 Marc Camoletti (architect) (1857–1940), Swiss architect; namesake and grandfather of the playwright